Alkalibacillus haloalkaliphilus is a obligately alkaliphilic and extremely halotolerant bacterium from the genus Alkalibacillus.

References

Bacillaceae
Bacteria described in 1996